The 2017 United States mixed doubles curling Olympic trials were held from December 13–17 at the Four Seasons Curling Club in Blaine, Minnesota. The winner of this event was chosen to represent the United States at the 2018 Winter Olympics.

Teams
The teams that competed were:

Round-robin standings
Final round-robin standings

Playoffs

1 vs. 2
Saturday, December 15, 21:00

3 vs. 4
Saturday, December 15, 21:00

Semifinal
Sunday, December 16, 10:00

Final
Sunday, December 16, 15:00

References

External links

United States Mixed Doubles Curling Olympic Trials
United States Olympic Curling Trials
United States Mixed Doubles Curling Olympic Trials
United States Mixed Doubles Curling Olympic Trials
Sports in Blaine, Minnesota
Curling in Minnesota
United States Olympic Trials